Datto can refer to:

 Datto, Arkansas
 Datu, a title which denotes the rulers of numerous indigenous peoples throughout the Philippine archipelago
 Dattus a Lombard leader from Bari
 Datto (company), technology company